Anton Koch (20 January 1903 – 8 February 1963) was an Austrian footballer. He played in three matches for the Austria national football team from 1922 to 1925.

References

External links
 

1903 births
1963 deaths
Austrian footballers
Austria international footballers
Place of birth missing
Association footballers not categorized by position